Pete Bishop is a British film maker, animator and theatre set designer. He is best known as the director of the Channel 4 animation Bromwell High, director of the ITV cartoon series Captain Star, and as the National Theatre's Director of Animation for England People Very Nice.

Bishop was nominated for a 2010 British Olivier Award for animation in set design for his work on the National Theatre production of England People Very Nice.

Bromwell High, a Channel 4/Hat Trick Productions co-production, has been broadcast in the UK, Canada and South America, and won the best comedy award at the 2006 British Animation Awards.

Theatre of Hands, made with M Schlingmann won the 2010 Holland Animation Film Festival (HAFF) Grand Prix.

References

External links

British cartoonists
English comics writers
English animators
British animators
British animated film directors
British television directors
English television directors
English voice directors
Year of birth missing (living people)
Living people